Baldwin's Tower (Balduinova kula) is a defensive tower located in the Bulgarian town of Veliko Tarnovo, in the southeast of the Tsarevets Fortress.

The modern tower is designed by the architect Aleksandar Reshenov and built in 1930 based on the preserved medieval tower in the Cherven fortress near Ruse.

The tower was built near the location of the Frenhisar Gate, the south entrance to Tsarevets. The medieval tower guarded the gate and a water reservoir.

Latin Emperor Baldwin I died there after he was captured by Tsar Kaloyan of the Second Bulgarian Empire. Because of this, the modern tower is named Baldwin's Tower.

Tourist attractions in Veliko Tarnovo Province
Buildings and structures in Veliko Tarnovo
History of Veliko Tarnovo
Tower houses in Bulgaria